Olive May (November 17, 1871 – July 24, 1938) was an American stage actress. She appeared in the popular play Arizona and appeared in Maude Adams's company.

Personal life
May was married to playwright Henry Guy Carleton from 1894 to 1898.  She married actor and manager John W. Albaugh Jr. (son of John W. Albaugh) in 1907; he died in 1910.

Death
May died on July 24, 1938, in Beverly Hills, California at the age of 66.

Selected performances
 The Butterflies (1894) as Suzanne Elise
 The White Heather (1897) as Mollie Fanshawe
 Arizona (1899) as Bonita (Chicago debut) (Eleanor Robson took over by time of 1900 New York debut)
 Richard Carvel (1900) as Patty Swain

References

External links

Olive May gallery at the Museum of the City of New York

1871 births
1938 deaths
19th-century American actresses
20th-century American actresses
American stage actresses